Maine State Music Theatre (MSMT) is a professional performing arts organization based in Brunswick, Maine. MSMT presents a summer season of four fully staged musicals, a concert series, and a Theatre for Young Audiences series. The company attracts the best and brightest casts, crews, and administrators from Broadway, national tours, and regional theaters. MSMT’s mission is to offer engaging live professional performances and outreach opportunities that entertain, educate, and enrich with power and passion. Since its first season, MSMT's shows have been presented in the Pickard Theater on the campus of Bowdoin College.

History

Early Years (1950s - 1970s) 
MSMT began as Brunswick Music Theatre (BMT). Founded by Victoria (Vicki) Crandall, BMT opened in 1959 with a summer production of Song of Norway. In the next decade, playhouses became quite prevalent in New England. BMT was one of the few that exclusively produced musical theatre. In the 1970s, BMT changed to a non-profit organization in order to focus on establishing an intern program that would help equip young and emerging theatre artists for their intended industry.

Name Change & Growing Influence (1980s - 1990s) 
In 1988, BMT celebrated its 30th anniversary. Governor John R. McKernan presented an award to founder Vicki Crandall, and the organization changed its name to Maine State Music Theatre to reflect that its influence had reached past the Midcoast region of the state. By this time, the number of professional theaters in New England had been significantly reduced. MSMT was one of the very few remaining musical houses.

Recent Years (2000s - 2020s) 
During the late 2000s, as the severity of the housing crisis grew, MSMT was presented with an opportunity to make the Gorham campus of the University of Southern Maine its home base. The Board of Trustees opted to remain in Brunswick, as they were committed to remaining in the birthplace of the organization. This commitment prompted them to purchase the Maine Line Bus Garage at 22 Elm Street. The space was renovated to become a permanent home for MSMT, complete with administrative offices, rehearsal spaces and technical facilities. Performances would still be mounted in the Pickard Theater.

In 2015, MSMT announced a three-year $2 million capital campaign. The purpose of the campaign was multi-faceted: 

 Fulfilling commitments to the organization’s partner and lessor, Bowdoin College. MSMT paid for replacement of carpeting and seats, as well as upgrades to the hearing system in Pickard Theater.
 Providing housing for theatre professionals.
 Attending to the repair and maintenance of current properties used for housing, administrative offices, technical shops, and studios.

The COVID-19 pandemic forced MSMT to cancel its previously announced 2020 season, the first time a summer season had been canceled by the organization. MSMT created the Lifeline Fund to offset losses and remain strong and prepared for 2021. Subscribers and patrons, businesses and organizations rallied to support the theatre during this difficult time, preserving the legacy of the organization. Though a 2021 season was announced, the pandemic forced MSMT to cancel all events, other than its production of Jersey Boys. In 2022, MSMT returned for a full summer season.

Educational Fellowship Program 
Every summer, MSMT’s diverse Educational Fellowship Program brings 45 young theatre students and early career professionals to Maine to participate in a full-immersion program focused on practical, experiential training designed to ease the transition into a professional career. The program, which serves to bridge the gap between their education and the professional world, has received national recognition and has been featured on PBS and in national and regional publications. This intensive program gives those with aspirations of a life in the performing arts the chance to work alongside professionals in their field.

Notable alumni 
Theatre artists who have gone through the MSMT Educational Fellowship Program include:

 Ephie Aardema (2009)
 Jay Carey (2001)
 Lindsay Nicole Chambers (2002)
 Jennifer Coty (1991)
 Barrett Foa (1997)
 Tracy Geltman (2002)
 Amy Halldin (2001)
 Jeff Heimbrock (2012)
 Angela Hooper (2010)
 Robyn Hurder (2001)
 Eric Jackson (1998)
 Elise Joan (1998)
 Marc Kessler (1993)
 Renée Klapmeyer (1998)
 Marty Lauter (2017)
 Aaron Lazar (1996)
 Amy Miller (2001)
 Patrick O'Neill (1999)
 Ian Rhodes (2000)
 Kim Sava (2008)
 Jonalyn Saxer (2012)
 Blake Stadnik (2013)
 Brittany Weber (2008)
 Bria Jene Williams (2018)
 Kyle Wrentz (2000)
 Daniel Yearwood (2017)
 Minami Yusui (2005)

Previous Seasons

2000 
Big River  •  The Sound of Music  •  Swingtime Canteen  •  Titanic  •  Victor/Victoria

2001 
Footloose  •  Little Shop of Horrors  •  Oklahoma!  •  The Scarlet Pimpernel

2002 
Chicago  •  The King and I  •  Ragtime  •  She Loves Me

2003 
Hans Christian Anderson (Loesser)  •  Jekyll & Hyde  •  La Cage Aux Folles  •  Smokey Joe's Cafe

2004 
Brigadoon  •  Follies  •  Kiss Me, Kate  •  Pump Boys and Dinettes

2005 
Cats  •  Mame  •  Miss Saigon  •  Swing!

2006 
South Pacific  •  Beauty and the Beast  •  Aida  •  The Full Monty

2007 
West Side Story  •  Thoroughly Modern Millie  •  Grand Hotel  •  Hairspray

2008 
Jesus Christ Superstar  •  All Shook Up  •  The Producers  •  Les Misérables

2009 
The Light in the Piazza  •  Crazy for You  •  Dirty Rotten Scoundrels  •  The Drowsy Chaperone

2010 
Always, Patsy Cline  •  My Fair Lady  •  Chicago  •  Spamalot

2011 
The Marvelous Wonderettes  •  Annie  •  Xanadu  •  The Wiz

2012 
A Chorus Line  •  Legally Blonde  •  Sunset Boulevard  •  42nd Street

2013 
Dreamgirls  •  Les Misérables  •  Gypsy  •  Mary Poppins

2014 
Buddy: The Buddy Holly Story  •  Chamberlain: A Civil War Romance (Knapp & Alper)  •  Seven Brides for Seven Brothers  •  Footloose

2015 
The Full Monty  •  Sister Act  •  The Music Man  •  Young Frankenstein

2016 
Ghost  •  Evita  •  Fiddler on the Roof  •  Mamma Mia!

2017 
Always, Patsy Cline  •  Guys and Dolls  •  Grease  •  Newsies

2018 
Million Dollar Quartet  •  Beauty and the Beast  •  Saturday Night Fever  •  Singin' in the Rain

2019 
Sophisticated Ladies  •  Treasure Island (Robin & Clark)  •  Hello, Dolly!  •  The Wizard of Oz

2021 
Jersey Boys

2022 
The Sound of Music  •  Joseph and the Amazing Technicolor Dreamcoat  •  The Color Purple  •  Kinky Boots

2023 
Titanic  •  Buddy: The Buddy Holly Story  •  9 to 5  •  Something Rotten!

MSMT Costumes 
Known for its elaborate original costume designs, Maine State Music Theatre launched MSMT Costumes in 2010. This branch of MSMT rents out the original costume packages for previous shows produced by the company. MSMT Costumes also owns and rents out the costumes from the original West End production of Spamalot, designed by Tim Hatley.

References

External links 

Theatre companies in Maine
Organizations based in Brunswick, Maine
1959 establishments in Maine
Arts organizations established in 1959
Theatres in Maine